The 2023 New York Liberty season will be the 27th season for the New York Liberty franchise of the WNBA, and their second season under Head Coach Sandy Brondello.

Transactions

WNBA Draft

Transactions

Roster Changes

Additions

Subtractions

Roster

Schedule

Regular Season

|- 
| 1
| May 19
| @ Washington
| 
| 
| 
| 
| Entertainment and Sports Arena
| 
|- 
| 2
| May 21
| Indiana
| 
| 
| 
| 
| Barclays Center
| 
|- 
| 3
| May 27
| Connecticut
| 
| 
| 
| 
| Barclays Center
| 
|- 
| 4
| May 30
| @ Seattle
| 
| 
| 
| 
| Climate Pledge Arena
| 

|- 
| 5
| June 2
| @ Chicago
| 
| 
| 
| 
| Wintrust Arena
| 
|- 
| 6
| June 4
| Chicago
| 
| 
| 
| 
| Barclays Center
| 
|- 
| 7
| June 7
| Minnesota
| 
| 
| 
| 
| Barclays Center
| 
|- 
| 8
| June 9
| @ Atlanta
| 
| 
| 
| 
| Gateway Center Arena
| 
|- 
| 9
| June 11
| Dallas
| 
| 
| 
| 
| Barclays Center
| 
|- 
| 10
| June 13
| Atlanta
| 
| 
| 
| 
| Barclays Center
| 
|- 
| 11
| June 18
| Phoenix
| 
| 
| 
| 
| Barclays Center
| 
|- 
| 12
| June 23
| @ Atlanta
| 
| 
| 
| 
| Gateway Center Arena
| 
|- 
| 13
| June 25
| Washington
| 
| 
| 
| 
| Barclays Center
|
|- 
| 14
| June 27
| @ Connecticut
| 
| 
| 
| 
| Mohegan Sun Arena
| 
|- 
| 15
| June 29
| @ Las Vegas
| 
| 
| 
| 
| Michelob Ultra Arena
| 

|- 
| 16
| July 2
| @ Seattle
| 
| 
| 
| 
| Climate Pledge Arena
| 
|- 
| 17
| July 5
| Phoenix
| 
| 
| 
| 
| Barclays Center
|
|- 
| 18
| July 8
| Seattle
| 
| 
| 
| 
| Barclays Center
| 
|- 
| 19
| July 12
| @ Indiana
| 
| 
| 
| 
| Gainbridge Fieldhouse
|
|- 
| 20
| July 19
| Dallas
| 
| 
| 
| 
| Barclays Center
|
|- 
| 21
| July 21
| @ Washington
| 
| 
| 
| 
| Entertainment and Sports Arena
|
|- 
| 22
| July 23
| Indiana
| 
| 
| 
| 
| Barclays Center
|
|- 
| 23
| July 25
| Seattle
| 
| 
| 
| 
| Barclays Center
|
|- 
| 24
| July 27
| Atlanta
| 
| 
| 
| 
| Barclays Center
|
|- 
| 25
| July 30
| @ Los Angeles
| 
| 
| 
| 
| Crypto.com Arena
|

|- 
| 26
| August 1
| @ Los Angeles
| 
| 
| 
| 
| Crypto.com Arena
|
|- 
| 27
| August 4
| @ Minnesota
| 
| 
| 
| 
| Target Center
|
|- 
| 28
| August 6
| Las Vegas
| 
| 
| 
| 
| Barclays Center
|
|- 
| 29
| August 11
| Chicago
| 
| 
| 
| 
| Barclays Center
|
|- 
| 30
| August 13
| @ Indiana
| 
| 
| 
| 
| Gainbridge Fieldhouse
|
|- 
| 31
| August 17
| @ Las Vegas
| 
| 
| 
| 
| Michelob Ultra Arena
|
|- 
| 32
| August 18
| @ Phoenix
| 
| 
| 
| 
| Footprint Center
|
|- 
| 33
| August 24
| @ Connecticut
| 
| 
| 
| 
| Mohegan Sun Arena
|
|- 
| 34
| August 26
| @ Minnesota
| 
| 
| 
| 
| Target Center
|
|- 
| 35
| August 28
| Las Vegas
| 
| 
| 
| 
| Barclays Center
|

|- 
| 36
| September 1
| Connecticut
| 
| 
| 
| 
| Barclays Center
|
|- 
| 37
| September 3
| @ Chicago
| 
| 
| 
| 
| Wintrust Arena
|
|- 
| 38
| September 5
| @ Dallas
| 
| 
| 
| 
| College Park Center
|
|- 
| 39
| September 7
| Los Angeles
| 
| 
| 
| 
| Barclays Center
|
|- 
| 40
| September 10
| Washington
| 
| 
| 
| 
| Barclays Center
|
|-

Standings

Statistics

Regular Season

Awards and Honors

References

External links
The Official Site of the New York Liberty

New York Liberty seasons
New York Liberty
New York Liberty
New York Liberty